Broadway Daddies is a 1928 American silent melodrama film directed by Fred Windemere. It stars Jacqueline Logan, Alec B. Francis, Rex Lease, and was released on April 7, 1928.

Plot

Eve Delmar is a pretty chorus line dancer, who is the center of attention of a group of wealthy admirers. However, she develops feelings for Richard Kennedy, who she assumes is not wealthy, but simply ambitious. Little does she know that Richard is in fact quite wealthy, the son of millionaire John Lambert Kennedy.  He chooses not to reveal his status, because he wants Eve to fall in love with him, and not with his money.

When Eve finds out that Richard is wealthy, she feels that he was simply playing with her affections.  To get back at him, she agrees to attend a party with another wealthy suitor, James Leech. The party turns quite raucous, and Leech tries to seduce Eve, but she rebuffs him. However, the events of the party appear in the newspaper, and both Richard and his father get the impression that Eve might have misbehaved.

Eve and Richard reconcile, and both he and John Kennedy understand that she did nothing untoward with anyone. This is further backed up when Leech appears and confirms that he had attempted to seduce her, but that she was the perfect lady and did not fall for his advances. Leech tells John that he owes the young lady an apology, and Richard and Eve continue their love affair.

Cast
 Jacqueline Logan as Eve Delmar
 Alec B. Francis as John Lambert Kennedy
 Rex Lease as Richard Kennedy
 Phillips Smalley as James Leech
 De Sacia Mooers as Fay King
 Clarissa Selwynne as Mrs. Winthrop Forrest
 Betty Francisco as Agnes Forrest

Production
In late February, it was revealed that Fred Windemere was chosen to helm the project, and Alec B. Francis would be starring in the picture. Production began in early March. In March, it was announced that Jacqueline Logan had been chosen to replace Bessie Love as the lead in the film. To prepare for her role, Logan spent time rehearsing with professional chorus line companies. In mid-March Columbia announced that Alec B. Francis and Rex Lease would have supporting roles. Production on the film was completed by the end of March. The film was the first release in April by Columbia, premiering on April 7.

Reception
Harrison's Reports gave the picture a good review, although they found the plot a bit hackneyed, but did manage to hold the audience's interest. They enjoyed the performances of Logan, Francis and Lease.

References

External links

1928 films
Silent American drama films
1928 drama films
American silent feature films
Columbia Pictures films
Films directed by Fred Windemere
1920s English-language films
1920s American films